Jonathan David Richards (born September 5, 1963) is an American attorney, judge, and Democratic politician.  He currently serves as a Wisconsin circuit court judge in Milwaukee County, since his appointment on September 22, 2020, by Governor Tony Evers.  He previously represented Milwaukee for 16 years in the Wisconsin State Assembly and was a candidate for Attorney General of Wisconsin in 2014.

Early life and education
Born in Waukesha, Wisconsin, Richards graduated from Waukesha North High School.  He received his bachelor's degree from Lawrence University and went on to earn his J.D. from University of Wisconsin Law School.  He also attended Keio University in Tokyo, Japan.  Richards taught English in Japan and volunteered with Mother Teresa in Calcutta, India.

Career
Richards has been an attorney for more than 25 years.  In 1998 he was elected to the Wisconsin State Assembly representing the 19th District for eight terms. He served as Assistant Minority Leader from 2003 to 2007. He also served on the Joint Finance Committee and chaired the Public Health Committee.

In October 2013, Richards announced he would run for Attorney General of Wisconsin rather than running for a ninth term in the Assembly.  He came in second in the Democratic primary election of August 2014, with 90,101 votes (33%) to 144,369 (52%) for Susan Happ, who went on to lose the general election in November.

Following the end of his term in the Assembly, Richards joined the Milwaukee law firm Ziino, Germanotta, Knoll & Christensen. He also worked as a volunteer attorney with the Eviction Defense Project as well as for victims of human trafficking through Lotus Legal Clinic, and was director of the Take Back My Meds coalition—which encourages the safe disposal of unused medicines to prevent drug abuse and lake contamination.

On September 22, 2020, Governor Tony Evers announced he had appointed Richards to the Wisconsin Circuit Court seat recently vacated by the resignation of Judge Jeffrey Conen.  Judge Richards announced he will seek election to a full term on the court in the 2021 spring election.

Electoral history

Wisconsin Assembly (1998–2012)

Wisconsin Attorney General (2014)

| colspan="6" style="text-align:center;background-color: #e9e9e9;"| Democratic Primary, August 12, 2014

Wisconsin Circuit Court (2021)

| colspan="6" style="text-align:center;background-color: #e9e9e9;"| General Election, April 6, 2021

References

External links
 
 
 2020 Circuit Judge campaign website
 2014 Attorney General campaign website (Archived)
 Jonathan D. Richards at Ziino, Germanotta, Knoll & Christensen
 Follow the Money – Jon Richards
2008 2006 2004 2002 2000 1998 campaign contributions
Campaign 2008 campaign contributions at Wisconsin Democracy Campaign

Democratic Party members of the Wisconsin State Assembly
1963 births
Living people
Politicians from Milwaukee
Politicians from Waukesha, Wisconsin
Wisconsin lawyers
Lawrence University alumni
University of Wisconsin Law School alumni
Keio University alumni
21st-century American politicians
Lawyers from Milwaukee